Glyn Dearman (30 December 1939 – 30 November 1997) was an English actor, originally a child actor, whose career spanned almost two decades, including the eponymous Jennings in BBC Children's Hour "Jennings at School". Dearman is perhaps best remembered for his portrayal of the character Tiny Tim in the 1951 film Scrooge. He was also a BBC Radio producer in the latter part of his career and directed the radio plays of Angela Carter. He died after falling down a flight of stairs at his home at the age of 57.

Filmography

References

External links 
 
 John Tydeman, "Obituary: Glyn Dearman", The Independent, 4 December 1997.
 Photo: Tiny Tim Cratchit

English male film actors
English male child actors
English radio producers
1939 births
1997 deaths
20th-century English male actors